Duperron or du Perron is a demonym of the Perron region of northwestern France, and may refer to:

 Abraham Hyacinthe Anquetil-Duperron (1731–1805), French orientalist
 Edgar du Perron (1899–1940), Dutch poet and author
 Jacques-Davy Duperron (1556–1618), French cardinal
 Louis-Pierre Anquetil-Duperron (1723–1808), French historian
 Thalour du Perron, Governor of Plaisance, Newfoundland from 1662 to 1664

See also
 Perron (disambiguation)